William Fagan may refer to:

 Willie Fagan (1917–1992), footballer who played for Liverpool
 William Trant Fagan (1801–1859), Irish writer and Member of Parliament from Cork
 William Fagan (MP) (1832–1890), Member of the UK Parliament for Carlow Borough
 Bill Fagan (1869–1930), baseball player